The 2015 ICF World Junior and U23 Canoe Slalom Championships took place in Foz do Iguaçu, Brazil from 22 to 26 April 2015 under the auspices of the International Canoe Federation (ICF). It was the 17th edition of the competition for Juniors (U18) and the 4th edition for the Under 23 category.

No medals were awarded for the men's C2 team events and the women's junior C1 team event due to low number of participating nations.

Medal summary

Men

Canoe

Junior

U23

Kayak

Junior

U23

Women

Canoe

Junior

U23

Kayak

Junior

U23

Medal table

References
Official results

External links
International Canoe Federation

ICF World Junior and U23 Canoe Slalom Championships
ICF World Junior and U23 Canoe Slalom Championships